was a renowned Japanese photographer.

References

Japanese photographers
1918 births
2004 deaths